The BENE-League Handball 2019-20 was the sixth edition of the international handball competition between Belgium and the Netherlands.

Achilles Bocholt were defending champions.

Final four tournament was held at Maaspoort in 's-Hertogenbosch, the Netherlands, Due to the COVID-19 pandemic, the final four was not held. the final ranking of the competition is the final ranking of the regular competition.

Clubs

Rangking

Final Four

Semifinals

Match for third place

Final

Awards
The all-star team was announced on 6 September 2020.

Goalkeeper: 
Right wing: 
Right back: 
Centre back: 
Left back: 
Left wing: 
Pivot:

References

External links 
 Official website

BENE-League Handball
2019–20 domestic handball leagues
BENE-League